The United States Army Squad Designated Marksman Rifle (SDM-R) is a heavily modified M16-series rifle intended to provide increased accuracy at longer ranges, giving infantry squads greater firepower.

The SDM-R is designed to provide engagement capability at the squad level to 600 meters, similar to the needs expressed by members of USSOCOM that led to the development of weapons such as the Mk 12 Special Purpose Rifle (SPR) and the SEAL Recon Rifle.

History
The addition of an embedded marksman at the platoon or squad level has been a continuing process in the U.S. military.  The U.S. Marine Corps (USMC) experimented with this during Project Metropolis, before creating the "Squad Advanced Marksman" (SAM) position along with the Squad Advanced Marksman Rifle (SAM-R) specifically for this purpose.

The 3rd Infantry Division followed suit in implementing a training program to have one marksman per squad, the Squad Designated Marksman (SDM), and developing a rifle, the Squad Designated Marksman Rifle (SDM-R). The SDM is an integral part of the squad and serves as a rifleman first and designated marksman second. The SDM is not meant to be a squad sniper who engages the enemy with precision fire at long ranges, but instead is trained to directly support the squad with well-aimed shots at ranges slightly beyond the normal engagement distances for riflemen.

Much like the U.S. Marine Corps SAM-R, the 3rd Infantry division SDM-R was an accurized M16 rifle built in-house by the United States Army Marksmanship Unit with 240 rifles provided for deployment in Iraq. The rifle was informally known as "the AMU rifle".

The SAM-R was replaced from US Army service, mostly due to performance of match grade 5.56 NATO ammo in the DMR role. It was being replaced by the HK 417 as the army's new SDM rifle. Most were expected to be in service by 2020.

Training
The National Guard Marksmanship Training Center of the Arkansas Army National Guard conducts the fourteen-day-long Squad Designated Marksman Course at Camp Joseph T. Robinson. Soldiers fire over 1500-rounds from the M16A4 rifle under the close supervision of course cadre. Another is done in Fort Benning, Georgia.

Task Force Small Arms Readiness Group (TF SARG) conducts the week-long SDM course at the SARG academy at Camp Bullis, Texas. Many of the instructors are President's 100 recipients.

Specifications
The US Army used either M16A2 or A4 lower receivers previously supplied by either Colt or Fabrique Nationale de Herstal.  All rifles were equipped with a fixed A2 stock and a Knight's Armament Company 2-stage match grade trigger The upper receivers were flat top style, but unlike the SAM-R and SPR, they did not have extended feed ramps.
Barrel: The 1:7 twist,  barrel from the M16A2 and A4 were replaced with a stainless steel Douglas Barrels 1:8 twist, 20-inch barrel, with 12 flutes cut into the barrel to reduce weight. The front sight block was installed with 4 set screws instead of two taper pins. The SDM-R retained the A2-style flash hider.
Sights and optics: The issued optic was a 4×32 Advanced Combat Optical Gunsight (ACOG) (models TA31F, TA31RCO, TA01, TA01B, or TA01NSN). A Matech Industries 600-meter backup iron sight was also used.
Handguard: Daniel Defense DDM4 Rail 12.0 handguard, with an octagonal aluminum collar locking it to the upper receiver. The handguard provides a free-floating Picatinny rail forend.
Bipod: A Harris S-L bipod attached to an ARMS #32 throw-lever rail mount was mounted to the underside of the handguard. Since the handguard was free-floating, it did not come into contact with the barrel, and any pressure from the bipod on the handguard did not deflect the barrel.

Variants
The 82nd Airborne Division examined an alternate version, based on the M4 carbine. A mid-length gas system was to be used, along with the Daniel Defense M4Rail 9.0 handguard. This effort never went beyond the staffing process.

See also

 United States Marine Corps Squad Advanced Marksman Rifle
 United States Marine Corps Designated Marksman Rifle
 SEAL Recon Rifle
 Mk 12 Special Purpose Rifle

References

External links
 Field Manual 3-22.9: Squad Designated Marksman training

5.56×45mm NATO semi-automatic rifles
Designated marksman rifles
Rifles of the United States
ArmaLite AR-10 derivatives
Military equipment introduced in the 2000s